Adhemar Pimenta (1896-1970) was a Brazilian football manager.

He was born in Rio de Janeiro on April 12, 1896, and died in the same city on August 26, 1970.

References
 Obituaries Jornal do Brasil, Folha de S. Paulo, et al. (1970)

1896 births
1970 deaths
Sportspeople from Rio de Janeiro (city)
Brazilian football managers
Bangu Atlético Clube managers
Brazil national football team managers
Santos FC managers
1938 FIFA World Cup managers
Botafogo de Futebol e Regatas managers